The Venerable Richard Lichfield  was a priest in England during the   15th-century.

CLichfield was educated at the University of Oxford. He was Archdeacon of Middlesex from 1476 until his death in 1496.

There was a memorial brass to him in the quire at Old St Paul's Cathedral.

Notes 

Alumni of the University of Oxford
15th-century English people
Archdeacons of Middlesex
1496 deaths